Rocky promontory or Punta Cuatro Romano or Roman Figure Four Mountain or Roman Four Rock is a cliff/promontory, rising to 830 m, marking the north side of the entrance to Neny Fjord on the west coast of Graham Land. Roman Four Promontory was first charted by the British Graham Land Expedition (BGLE) (1934–1937) under John Riddoch Rymill. The name was given by members of East Base of the United States Antarctic Service (USAS) Expedition (1939–1941), whose base was located on nearby Stonington Island, and derives from snow-filled clefts along the face of the promontory giving the appearance of a Roman numeral IV.

Cliffs of Graham Land
Fallières Coast